Ciaran Donnelly is an Irish film and television director. He is primarily known for his direction of major international series such as Camelot, The Tudors, Titanic: Blood and Steel and Vikings.

His works include four episodes of the ITV comedy drama series Cold Feet (including the episode that won the series the Best Drama Series BAFTA), the crime drama series Donovan, the BBC One drama Spooks and the 2016 Discovery Channel historical miniseries Harley and the Davidsons. His 2006 serial Stardust won the IFTA for Best Single Drama/Drama Serial.

Since 2006, he has been a lead director on the Irish/Canadian series The Tudors, for which he won another IFTA in 2009. In 2010, he was nominated for another IFTA for his work on the third season. He garnered yet another IFTA nomination in 2013 for Titanic: Blood and Steel. In february 2022 it was announced that Donnelly was nominated once more for an IFTA for his work on The Wheel of Time.

Filmography 

Also second unit director in Peaches (2000).

References

External links 

Irish film directors
Irish television directors
Living people
Place of birth missing (living people)
Year of birth missing (living people)